is the eighth solo studio album by Japanese hip hop producer DJ Krush. It was released in 2004. It peaked at number 123 on the Oricon Albums Chart, as well as number 16 on the Billboard Top Dance/Electronic Albums chart.

Production
The album features guest appearances from American rappers Mr. Lif ("Nosferatu") and Aesop Rock ("Kill Switch"), both of whom were signed to Definitive Jux at that time.

Critical reception

Cameron Macdonald of Pitchfork gave the albm a 7.3 out of 10, saying, "Krush's use of space and texture remain not just formidable, but remarkably relevant." Tim O'Neil of PopMatters wrote: "This album is merely an indicator that Krush has mastered, as few before him have, the subtle art of true cultural assimilation through the prism of electronic music."

Track listing

Charts

References

External links
 

2004 albums
DJ Krush albums